Przywidz may refer to:
 Przywidz, Łódź Voivodeship, a village in Poddębice County, Łódź Voivodeship, Poland
 Przywidz, Pomeranian Voivodeship, a village in Gdańsk County, Pomeranian Voivodeship, Poland